WHHW (1130 AM) is a radio station broadcasting a Regional Mexican radio format. It is licensed to Hilton Head Island, South Carolina. The station is currently owned by Alpha Media, and operated by Dick Broadcasting under a local marketing agreement.

WHHW broadcasts at 1,000 watts by day. But because AM 1130 is a clear channel frequency, it must reduce power to 500 watts at night to avoid interference. WHHW simulcasts its programming on an FM translator, W241CV at 96.1 MHz, broadcasting at a power level of 99 watts.

History
On February 14, 1983, the station went on the air as WHHR with the call sign referring to Hilton Head Radio. It was a sister station to 106.1 WFXH-FM. WHHR changed its call letters on June 11, 1987 to WHHQ. On December 23, 1994, it changed its call sign back to WHHR, only to change the call letters again on New Year's Day 1995 to WFXH. On February 28, 2011, the call sign was changed to WHHW.

Prior to March 6, 2011, the station was an ESPN Radio Network affiliate, WFXH. It previously featured programming from CNN Radio.

Monty Jett, formerly morning host on co-owned WLOW, moved to WHHW with its change to "1130 the Island", a soft AC/adult standards format.

In 2015, WHHW changed to Adult Album Alternative with the slogan "True. Music. Variety."

In September 2017, Dick Broadcasting announced the purchase of Alpha Media stations in three markets, including Savannah.

In 2018, WHHW switched to oldies as "The Island".

On October 4, 2021, WHHW changed their format from oldies to Regional Mexican, branded as "La Pantera 96.1".

Previous logos

References

External links

HHW
Radio stations established in 1983
1983 establishments in South Carolina
Alpha Media radio stations
Regional Mexican radio stations in the United States